Kimilili is a town and area in Kenya's Bungoma County. The area is occupied mainly by the Bukusu and few Teso communities it is a trading center for agricultural goods and services. The town has an urban population of 94,927.

The surrounding region is mainly farmland, the main cash crops being coffee, maize, beans, sunflower seed sugarcane and bananas.

The main town centre has several economic activities which include retail grocery stores, supermarkets, schools and computer colleges.

There are numerous non-governmental organizations in Kimilili, the two main ones being ICFEM  and Omwabini.

Kimilili is a home to the Western Provincial Police Training Center. Due to its strength in trade and education, Kimilili's urban population is on the rise. It was home to many government workers who held office positions in the former Mt Elgon District, which was merged into Bungoma County in 2010.

History
In past years, this region has suffered from land conflicts that have resulted in displacement of thousands. The Sabaot Land Defence Force, who were the aggressors and the main agitators of this conflict, have, however, been subdued by the government.

Education
Kimilili has one of the best schools in Kenya based on Friends School Kamusinga's consistent academic and sports excellence. Other high schools are Moi girls' high school Kamusinga, Kimilili boys' high school, Maeni girls' secondary school and St. Theresa's girls' secondary school. Four primary private schools are found: PHIM primary school, Shekinah school, Dreamland Education Centre and Farcon academy. Public primary schools are Kimilili R.C. boys', Kimilili R.C. girls', Kimilili D.E.B, Kamusinga primary, Khwiroro primary, Bituyu, Buko and Maeni primary schools. Additionally, Matili F.Y.M primary, Matili R.C, and Namawanga primary school are a few schools which have produced scholars. Kimilili has a teachers' training center (Shima TTC).

References

Populated places in Bungoma County